HMNZS Wakakura (P3555) was a Moa-class inshore patrol vessel of the Royal New Zealand Navy. It was commissioned in March 1985 for the Naval Volunteer Reserve.

Service
Wakakura was attached to the Wellington division of the Naval Volunteer Reserve from her commissioning until 2005, when she returned to the fleet base in Auckland.

Wakakura was the second ship of this name to serve in the New Zealand Navy. The first ship was the training minesweeper  (1926–1947).  Wakakura is a Māori word which could mean "precious canoe" or could mean "training boat".

Decommissioning
After decommissioning the Wakakura was put up for sale by tender. The vessel was acquired by the owner of Helipro, Rick Lucas, under the Lucas Family Trust. With the receivership of Helipro in 2014, the vessel was sold in February 2015 to Jason and Clayton Knowles and moved from Queens Wharf Wellington to the Marlborough Sounds. As of 2020 HMNZS Wakakura (P3555) remains tied to a jetty in Kaipapa Bay in the Marlborough Sounds at 41°13'36.5"S 174°04'37.2"E. In July, 2022, the ship was purchased by Maria Kuster and Sean Liam Ellis who own and operate Pure Salt; a charter company who operate the sister ship "Flightless". M.V. Flightless is based in the coastal waters of Fiordland and Stewart Island. It is understood Wakakura will operate as a charter vessel for Pure Salt.

See also 
 Patrol boats of the Royal New Zealand Navy

Notes

References
 McDougall, R J  (1989) New Zealand Naval Vessels. Government Printing Office. 

Ships built in New Zealand
Moa-class patrol boats